KUWR (91.9 FM) is a radio station licensed to Laramie, Wyoming. The station is owned by the  University of Wyoming, and is the flagship of Wyoming Public Radio (WPR), airing a format consisting of news, jazz, adult album alternative and classical music. The station's tower is located east of Laramie on Pilot Hill.

External links
wyomingpublicmedia.org

UWR
UWR
NPR member stations